Rossiya Russian Airlines (Pulkovo) operates the following services (as of December 2006):

Africa
Egypt
Hurghada (Hurghada International Airport)
Morocco
Agadir (Al Massira Airport)
Tunisia
Djerba (Djerba–Zarzis International Airport)
Monastir (Monastir Habib Bourguiba International Airport)
Tunis (Tunis-Carthage International Airport)

Asia

Central Asia
Kazakhstan
Almaty (Almaty International Airport)
Shymkent (Shymkent International Airport)
Karaganda (Sary-Arka Airport)
Kostanay (Kostanay Airport)
Nur-Sultan (Nursultan Nazarbayev International Airport)
Pavlodar (Pavlodar Airport)
Oskemen (Oskemen Airport)
Kyrgyzstan
Bishkek (Manas International Airport)
Uzbekistan
Bukhara (Bukhara Airport)
Nukus (Nukus Airport)
Samarkand (Samarkand Airport)
Tashkent (Tashkent International Airport)

East Asia
China, People's Republic of
Beijing (Beijing Capital International Airport)
Shanghai (Shanghai Pudong International Airport)

South Asia
India
 Mumbai (Chatrapati Shivaji International Airport)

Southeast Asia
Thailand
Phuket City (Phuket International Airport)
Utapao (U-Tapao International Airport)

Southwest Asia
Armenia
Yerevan (Zvartnots International Airport)
Azerbaijan
Baku (Heydar Aliyev International Airport)
Egypt
Sharm el-Sheikh (Ophira Int'l Airport)
Georgia
Tbilisi (Tbilisi International Airport)
Israel
Tel-Aviv (Ben Gurion International Airport)
United Arab Emirates
Dubai (Dubai International Airport)

Europe

Eastern Europe
Bulgaria
Burgas (Burgas Airport)
Sofia (Sofia Airport)
Varna (Varna International Airport)
Czech Republic
Prague (Ruzyne International Airport)
Hungary
Budapest (Budapest Ferihegy International Airport)
Russia
Adler/Sochi (Adler-Sochi International Airport)
Anapa (Vityazevo Airport)
Arkhangelsk (Talagi Airport)
Barnaul (Barnaul Airport)
Bratsk (Bratsk Airport)
Irkutsk (Irkutsk International Airport)
Chelyabinsk (Balandino Airport)
Kaliningrad (Khrabrovo Airport)
Khabarovsk (Khabarovsk Novy Airport)
Khanty-Mansiysk (Khanty-Mansiysk Airport)
Krasnodar (Pashkovsky Airport)
Krasnoyarsk (Krasnoyarsk Yemelyanovo Airport)
Mineralnye Vody (Mineralnye Vody Airport)
Moscow (Sheremetyevo International Airport)
Nizhnevartovsk (Nizhnevartovsk Airport)
Norilsk (Norilsk Airport)
Novokuznetsk (Novokuznetsk Spichenkovo Airport)
Novosibirsk (Novosibirsk Tolmachevo Airport)
Novy Urengoy (Novy Urengoy Airport)
Omsk (Tsentralny Airport)
Perm (Bolshoye Savino Airport)
Petropavlovsk-Kamchatsky (Petropavlovsk-Kamchatsky Airport)
Rostov-on-Don (Rostov-on-Don Airport)
Samara (Samara Kurumoch Airport)
Saint Petersburg (Pulkovo Airport) (hub)
Surgut (Surgut Airport)
Tyumen (Roschino Airport)
Ufa (Ufa Airport)
Vladivostok (Vladivostok International Airport)
Volgograd (Gumrak Airport)
Yekaterinburg (Koltsovo International Airport)
Ukraine
Kyiv (Boryspil Airport)
Simferopol (Simferopol Airport)

Northern Europe
Denmark
Copenhagen (Copenhagen Airport)
Finland
Helsinki (Helsinki-Vantaa Airport)
Sweden
Stockholm (Stockholm-Arlanda Airport)
United Kingdom
London (London Heathrow Airport)
London (London Gatwick Airport)

Southern Europe
Cyprus
Larnaca (Larnaca International Airport)
Greece
Athens (Athens International Airport)
Heraklion (Heraklion International Airport, "Nikos Kazantzakis")
Thessaloniki (Thessaloniki International Airport, "Macedonia")
Italy
Milan (Malpensa International Airport)
Rome (Leonardo da Vinci International Airport)
Rimini (Federico Fellini International Airport)
Spain
Alicante (Alicante Airport)
Barcelona (Barcelona International Airport)
Burgas (Burgas Airport)
Madrid (Madrid Barajas International Airport)
Málaga (Málaga Airport)
Palma de Mallorca (Son Sant Joan Airport)
Tenerife (Reina Sofía Airport)
Turkey
Antalya (Antalya Airport)
Bodrum (Milas–Bodrum Airport)
Dalaman (Dalaman Airport)
Istanbul (Istanbul Airport)

Western Europe
Austria
Vienna (Vienna International Airport)
France
Paris (Charles de Gaulle Airport)
Germany
Berlin (Berlin-Schonefeld International Airport)
Düsseldorf (Düsseldorf Airport)
Hamburg (Hamburg Airport)
Hannover (Hanover/Langenhagen International Airport)
Frankfurt (Frankfurt International Airport)
Munich (Munich International Airport)
Netherlands
Amsterdam (Amsterdam Schiphol Airport)
Switzerland
Geneva (Geneva Cointrin International Airport)
Zurich (Zurich Airport)

External links 
 Rossiya Russian Airlines Destinations Website

Pulkovo